Saba Qamar Zaman (born 5 April 1984), known professionally as Saba Qamar, is a Pakistani actress who works predominantly in Urdu films and television. She has won several accolades including Lux Style Awards and Hum Awards. Qamar is one of Pakistan's most popular and highest-paid actresses. Government of Pakistan honoured her Tamgha-e-Imtiaz in 2012, and Pride of Performance in 2016.
 
Qamar first received positive media attention for the role of Fatima Jinnah in the historical drama Jinnah Ke Naam (2007), and this breakthrough was followed with further success in several television series, including the pre-partition drama Dastaan, the melodrama Uraan (both 2010), the romantic dramas Maat and Pani Jaisa Piyar (both 2011), the socio Thakan (2012), thriller Sannata, the romantic Bunty I Love You (both 2013), family drama Digest Writer (2014), crime thriller Sangat (2015) and Besharam (2016), receiving Best Actress awards and nominations for each of them. She has also appeared in acclaimed biographical film Manto (2015), romantic comedy Lahore Se Aagey (2016), and the Hindi educational drama Hindi Medium (2017), for which she received a nomination of Filmfare Award for Best Actress. 

Qamar continued to draw praise for portraying Fouzia Azeem and Noor Jehan in the 2017 biographical dramas Baaghi and Main Manto, and a strong woman, fighting for her friend's attempted rape and murder in the 2019 courtroom drama Cheekh. The first of these earned her a Lux Style Award for Best Television Actress. She features in listings of the nation's most popular personalities.

Early life 
Saba Qamar Zaman was born on 5 April 1984 into a Sindhi family in Hyderabad, Sindh, Pakistan. She lost her father at a very young age and spent most of her childhood in Gujranwala with her grandmother. She got her early education in Gujranwala, then moved to Lahore to pursue further studies. Her family is settled in Karachi.

Acting career

Beginnings and breakthrough (2005–2011) 
Qamar appeared in the PTV Home television series Mein Aurat Hoon (2005). The series was shot in Lahore, and was followed by several classic PTV series including Gharoor, Taqdeer, Chaap, Dhoop Mein Andhera Hai, Kanpur Se Katas Tak, Unbiyaanable and Maamo. Later in 2007, Qamar appeared in ATV's series Khuda Gawah which was the remake of 1992 Indian film of the same name, and the biographical drama Jinnah Ke Naam, which was the production of PTV Home in the direction of Tariq Mairaj. She has played the role of Fatima Jinnah and the series was a tribute to the founder of Pakistan, Muhammad Ali Jinnah. Though the series failed commercially, Qamar received a nomination for Best TV Actress (Terrestrial) at the Lux Style Awards. In an earlier interview with The Express Tribune, Qamar confessed, "For me, acting is being able to express the feelings, emotions and expressions of different people and characters".

In 2010, she appeared in a supporting role of Surraya in Hum TV's pre partition television series Dastaan, an adaptation of Razia Butt's novel Bano. She was seen opposite Ahsan Khan, Sanam Baloch and Fawad Khan. Series proved to be the break-through for her and she won the Best TV Actress trophy at the Pakistan Media Awards (2010). She won the PTV Awards for the best TV actress in both public and jury choice categories at the 16th Annual PTV awards, held on 23 July 2011 for her role in Tinkay.Tinkay also earned her a nomination for Best Television Actress at Lux Style Awards. This was followed by a supporting role in the PTV Home's social drama on women Bint-e-Adam. Her role in the series was of a rich brat who falls for a boy from poor background, and marries him against her cruel father's wishes. Bint e Adam was a major critical and commercial hit, however, critics noted that her role was "limited" from an acting point of view.

Qamar then appeared in Sarmad Khoosat's romantic series Pani Jaisa Piyar (2011), where she played the character of Sana who has been engaged to Adarsh, the son of her mother's best friend ever since she was a child. Adarsh, however, has been unaware of this engagement, as his parents thought that he needed to focus more on his education than wedding plans. It was followed by a role in PTV's Tera Pyar Nahi Bhoole. She was paired opposite Ahsan Khan in both the series. Both of which garnered her Lux Style Award nominations for Best Television Actress. Later that year, she appeared in Maat where she played the role of selfish, self-obsessed Saman opposite Adnan Siddiqui and Aamina Sheikh. The series was critically and commercially hit and became the thirteen highest-rated Pakistani television series and also garnered her Pakistan Media Awards for Best Actress. That same year, Qamar collaborated with Sami Khan in three of Geo TV's projects, Jo Chale To Jaan Se Guzar Gaye, Tere Ik Nazar, and Main Chand Si, receiving further praise.

Critical acclaim and professional expansion (2012–2015) 

Qamar next appeared in Ameen Iqbal's Thakan (2012), which also starred Yumna Zaidi where she played the role of Sadaf who works extremely hard like a machine day and night to run her family but no one except her grandfather feels sympathy for her or even cares about her. It was followed by the leading roles in the Amna Nawaz Khan-written Na Kaho Tum Mere Nahi (2012) and Faiza Iftikhar's Yahan Pyar Nahin Hai (2012). The later of which earned her a nomination for Best Actress at Hum Awards. She gained recognition for portraying a range of characters in the serials Shehryar Shehzadi (2012), Kaash Aisa Ho (2013), Sannata (2013), and Ullu Baraye Farokht Nahi (2013), some of which garnered her several best actress nominations. Qamar won her first Hum Awards for the Best TV Actress for her role as Diana in Bunty I Love You, at the 3rd Hum Awards. That same year, Qamar worked in the television film Aina (2013), opposite Faysal Qureshi. The film, a remake of the 1977 film of the same name, was well received by the audience and she was nominated for the Best Actress award at the Tarang Housefull Awards.After two consecutive years of poorly received serials, Qamar's career prospects began to improve in 2014; she appeared in five projects: Jaanam, Bay Emaan Mohabbat, Bunty I Love You, Izteraab, and Digest Writer. The romantic drama Jaanam (alongside Adnan Siddiqui) and the romance Bay Emaan Mohabbat (alongside Agha Ali and Adnan Shah Tipu) earned little praise, but the family drama Bunty I Love You (a story about a girl who got married at age of 17 to much older man, later dreams of living a free life after his death) was Qamar's first critical success since Maat. Directed by Siraj-ul-Haque, the series was generally well received. Reviewer from Daily Pakistan considered it along with Digest Writer as "one of the best performances of Qamar". The series received five nominations at Hum Awards including Qamar for best actress. She next appeared in Izteraab. Her performance as the working women did not go well and despite the strong cast, story, production house and promotions, the drama turned out to be a major critical and commercial Disaster.

Qamar appeared in three series in 2015. She first reunited with Muhammad Younis Butt and Fawad Wyne in the comedy series S.H.E where she played a role of lady S.H.O Bajirao Mastani. She then starred alongside Adeel Chaudhry in Fahim Burney's directorial Kaisay Tum Se Kahoon which tells the story of star-crossed lovers who are reincarnated. It was her third consecutive appearance in Momina Duraid's production. Although the series did not do well in terms of ratings, but her performance was praised by the critics. The following year, Qamar collaborated with Mikaal Zulfiqar for the third time (alongside Zahid Ahmed, Kiran Haq, and Sonia Mishal) in Kashif Nisar's Sangat where she played a role of Aisha, a rape survivor who faced difficulties when her husband came to know that he was not the biological father of a daughter they have. The series earned her the nomination for Best Actress in both Jury and Popular categories at the Hum Awards.

Qamar then made her acting debut with a leading actress in the acclaimed biographical drama Manto (2015). Directed by Sarmad Khoosat, the film was made on a big budget and performed poorly at the box office with a lifetime collection of Rs 5.05 million, however it was critically praised and Qamar's portrayal of the singer Noor Jehan was well received by the critics, and earned her a nomination at the ARY Films Awards for Best Supporting Actress. The film was later adapted into a television series with the same cast in 2017, titled as Main Manto, and was aired on Geo TV.

Established actress (2016–present) 
In 2016, Qamar played the role of a struggling actress in the period drama Mein Sitara, (serial based on lollywood golden era) alongside Mekaal Zulfiqar and appeared as Mishal in Farooq Rind's Besharam opposite Zahid Ahmed. The later was a commercially and critically hit. Sadaf Haider of The Express Tribune praised her saying, "Qamar is in great form as Mishi and plays her with restraint and quiet power; a welcome relief from the wounded women she has played of late". During the 16th Lux Style Awards, the series earned 5 nominations including Qamar for Best TV actress. She was also nominated for her projects Mein Sitara and Lahore Se Aagey in Best Actress category. Qamar next played a rockstar opposite Yasir Hussain, in the travel comedy Lahore Se Aagey (2016). The film, a sequel to the comedy Karachi Se Lahore, ranks among the highest-grossing Pakistani films of all time with a worldwide grossing of Rs21.60 million. Later that year, she played a leading role in the psycho–thriller 8969, a critical and commercial failure.

Qamar was offered an Indian film opposite Randeep Hooda, and supporting roles in Once Upon a Time in Mumbaai (2012) and Heroine (2012), which she declined. After the 2016 Uri attack, relations between India and Pakistan deteriorated; the Indian Motion Picture Producers Association (IMPPA) and the Film Producers Guild of India banned Pakistani artists from working in India until the situation normalised. The comedy-drama Hindi Medium (2017), in which Qamar played the lead female role of Mita Batra, a nouveau riche opposite Irrfan Khan, marked her first project in the Hindi cinema. Critical reception of the film was positive. A reviewer for The Times of India wrote, "Saba, as the dominating wife is sheer delight onscreen". In a scathing review, Sreehari Nair of Rediff.com labelled the film "fascinatingly frustrating" and called Qamar "natural actress, sexual daring". The film earned over ₹334.36 million worldwide, a majority of which came from the Chinese box office. and China with a collection of ₹334.36 million. Qamar received several Best Female Debut and Best Actress awards and nominations at various award ceremonies, including a Best Actress nomination at Filmfare. Later that year, Qamar was declared as the top Bollywood debutante of 2017 by Eastern Eye.

In 2017, Qamar worked in the biographical drama series Baaghi, in the role of Pakistani controversial figure Qandeel Baloch. The series was a critical and commercial success, becoming one of the highest-grossing Pakistani drama of 2017. Qamar's performance was widely praised by the critics and her portrayal of the actress and singer was applauded even before its release. Neeha of The Nation wrote, "Without a doubt, Qamar has done an outstanding job", whereas reviewer from The Express Tribune said she "slayed the social media star with such finesse". The series earned her a Lux Style Awards for Best Actress (Television) and IPPA Awards for Best Actress.

In 2018, Qamar appeared in three short films. She first paired with Ahsan Khan in Siraj-ul-Haque directorial Moomal Rano. The film was made as part of the Zeal For Unity initiative to bridge cultural barriers between India and Pakistan. It was critically praised and was nominated for Best film at the 2018 European festival. It was also released by digital platform Zee5. She then appeared in Fahim Burney's Dil Diyan Gallan, opposite Zahid Ahmed where she played the character of Raniya and Iss Dil Ki Essi Ki Tessi. in 2019, Qamar worked in crime drama Cheekh, opposite Bilal Abbas khan, she played a headstrong girl who fights for justice. It is considered both critical and commercial blockbuster. Qamar next collaborated with Sarmad Khoosat for film Kamli, and Saqib Khan's debut film, titled Ghabrana Nahi Hai.

Other work and media image 
 
In 2009, Qamar joined the political satire show Hum Sab Umeed Se Hain, as a host and presenter where she also did the parody of politicians and actors. The show was extremely popular and was at the number one spot in ratings in Pakistan. She decided to quit the show and was replaced by Meera in 2013. In January 2018, she appeared in photoshoot for Mahid Khawar's creation "Padmavat" where she dressed up like Rani Padmavati. In May 2018, she showcased golden bridal couture for designer Nilofer Shahid. She was showstopper for Rimple and Harpreet Narula's first Pakistan show on Shaan-E-Pakistan. On 10 December 2018, she walked the ramp for designer Uzma Babar's collection Umsha on Bridal Couture Week. Qamar became the ambassador for a number of brands including Lux Pakistan, Sunsilk, Dalda, Ufone, and Tapal.

Qamar is considered one of the nation's most popular and highest-paid actresses. After the success of Mein Sitara and Hindi Medium, she was cited by critics as one of the finest actresses in Pakistan. Throughout her career, she has received several accolades including Lux Style Awards, Hum Awards, Pakistan Media Awards, PTV Awards and a Filmfare Awards nomination. In 2012, Government of Pakistan honoured her with Tamgha-e-Imtiaz, the fourth-highest decoration given to civilians in Pakistan based on their achievements. In 2016, she received Pride of Performance in recognition of meritorious work in the fields of arts.

In addition to acting, Qamar has supported charitable organisations for various causes. She is involved with several humanitarian causes and is vocal about issues faced by women and children. In June 2018, she did a special appearance in Shuja Haider's music video "Jeevan Daan" to raised awareness against child abuse. The song was socially relevant and highlights issues concerning children and women. In August 2018, Qamar expressed in an interview, "I encourage and urge people to invest in good education as it will shape the future of our children and our society". On Independence Day in 2018, Daily Times named Qamar "Pride of Pakistan".

In April 2020, she started her YouTube channel and released mini series Isolation based on the situation of Lockdown due to COVID-19. She further raised her hands for collecting COVID relief funds for poor minorities and transgender communities with Ali Zafar's charity trust "Ali Zafar Foundation". Qamar revealed thorugh her YouTube channel about her relationship in which she was engaged for eight years and parted ways with him. She described it as abusive relationship.

Filmography

Films

Telefilm

Short films

Television 

{| class="wikitable sortable mw-collapsible plainrowheaders" style="margin-right: 0;"
|+
|- style="text-align:center;"
! scope="col"|Year
! scope="col"|Title
! class="unsortable" scope="col"|Role
! scope="col"|Network
! class="unsortable" scope="col"|Ref(s)
|-
| rowspan="3"|2005
! scope="row" |  Mein Aurat Hoon
|Rubina
|PTV Home
|
|-
! scope="row" |  Chaap
|Zarina
| ATV
|
|-
! scope="row" | Sussar In Law
| Tania
| rowspan="7"|PTV Home
|
|-
| rowspan="7"|2006
! scope="row" |  Gharoor
| Sadia
|
|-
! scope="row" | Rait Kay Dairay
|Asma
|
|-
! scope="row" | Dhoop Mein Andhera Hai
|Zindagi
|
|-
! scope="row" |  Taqdeer
| Dua
|
|-
! scope="row" |  Kahin Tum Kahin Hum
| Mehru
|
|-
! scope="row"| Phool
| Kiran
|
|-
! scope="row" |  Banjar
| Roshni
| Geo Entertainment
|
|-
| rowspan="7"|2007
! scope="row" |  Khuda Gawah
|Sonia
| rowspan="4"|ATV
|
|-
! scope="row" | Dil Se Shikayat Hai
| Sara
|
|-
! scope="row" | Mohabbat Ab Nahi Hogi
| Silah
|
|-
! scope="row" | Number 1
| Zara
|
|-
! scope="row" | Not Responding
| Iffat
| rowspan="3"|PTV Home
|
|-
! scope="row" |  Mammo
|Salma
|
|-
!scope="row"| Un Biyan Able
|Rania
|
|-
|rowspan="6"|2008
|-
! scope="row" |  Woh Subh Kab Ayegi| Hina
| ATV
|
|-
! scope="row" |  Chubhan| Urooj
| rowspan="4"|PTV Home
|
|-
! scope="row" |  Bint e Adam| Zainab
|
|-
! scope="row" | Phool Aur Kantey| Simi
|
|-
! scope="row" |  Na Janay Kyun| Ayesha
|
|-
|rowspan="8"|2009
! scope="row"|Tere Ik Nazar| Nida
| rowspan="2"|Geo Entertainment
|
|-
! scope="row" | Nadia Naam Ki Larki| Nadia
|
|-
! scope="row" |  Jinnah Ke Naam| Fatima Jinnah
| rowspan="2"|PTV Home
|
|-
! scope="row" |  Tinkay| Eman
|
|-
! scope="row" | Muhabbat Yun Bhi Hoti Hai|Ghazal
| ATV
|
|-
! scope="row" |  Mishaal| Hiba
| PTV Home
|
|-
! scope="row" | Amarbail| Bakhshan
| ATV
|
|-
! scope="row" | Half Light| Aiza
| ARY Digital
|
|-
| rowspan="4" |2010
! scope="row" | Chand Ki Goud Main| Saboor
| Geo Entertainment
|
|-
! scope="row" |  Lahore Junction| Sabahat
| PTV Home
|
|-
! scope="row" |  Dastaan| Suraiya
|Hum TV
|
|-
! scope="row" |  Kanpur Se Katas Tak| Pooja
| Indus Vision 
|
|-
| rowspan="2"|2010-2011
! scope="row" |  Uraan| Ayesha
| Geo Entertainment
|
|-
! scope="row" | Aankh Salamat Andhay Log| Amara
| ATV
|
|-
| rowspan="2" |2011
! scope="row" |  Pani Jaisa Piyar| Sana
| Hum TV
|
|-
! scope="row"|Main Chand Si| Irsa
| ARY Digital
|
|-
| rowspan="8"|2011-2012
! scope="row"|Maat| Saman
| Hum TV
|
|-
! scope="row"|Ghar Ki Baat Hai| Seemi
| A-Plus TV
|
|-
! scope="row"|Tera Pyar Nahi Bhoole| Zartash
| rowspan="5"|PTV Home
|
|-
! scope="row" | Khalida Ki Walida 
|Khalida
|
|-
! scope="row" | Main Aisa Kyun Hoon| Nida
|
|-
! scope="row" |  Two In One| Sonia
|
|-
! scope="row" |Nazar|Katrina
|
|-
! scope="row"|Jo Chale To Jaan Se Guzar Gaye| Zufishan
| Geo Entertainment
|
|-
| rowspan="5" |2012
! scope="row"|Thakan| Sadaf
| ARY Digital
|
|-
! scope="row" | Bhool| Surraiya
| PTV Home
|
|-
! scope="row"|Yahan Pyar Nahin Hai| Haleema
| Hum TV
|
|-
! scope="row"|Shikwa Na Shikayat| Meerub
| Express Entertainment
|
|-
! scope="row"|Shehryar Shehzadi| Sarwat
| Urdu 1
|
|-
| rowspan="2"|2012-2013
! scope="row"|Aqal Bari Ya Bhains|Humaira
|TV One Pakistan
|
|-
! scope="row"|Na Kaho Tum Mere Nahi| Mehreen
|Hum TV
|
|-
| rowspan="2"|2013
! scope="row"|Kaash Aisa Ho| Irfa
| ARY Digital
|
|-
! scope="row"|Ullu Baraye Farokht Nahi| Gul-e-Rana
| Hum TV
|
|-
| rowspan="3"|2013-2014
! scope="row"|Miss Fire|Maya
|Geo Entertainment
|
|-
! scope="row"|Sannata| Rukayya
| ARY Digital
|
|-
! scope="row"|Bunty I Love You| Dania
| Hum TV
|
|-
| rowspan="3"| 2014
! scope="row"|Jaanam| Falak
| A-Plus TV
|
|-
! scope="row"|Izteraab| Zara
| Hum TV
|
|-
! scope="row"|Bay Emaan Mohabbat| Dania
| ARY Digital
|
|-
| rowspan="2"|2014-2015
! scope="row"|Na Katro Pankh Mere| Naamia
| ARY Zindagi
|
|-
! scope="row"|Digest Writer| Farida
|rowspan="2"|Hum TV
|
|-
|2015
! scope="row"|Kaisay Tum Se Kahoon| Anamta
|
|-
| rowspan="2"|2015-2016
! scope="row"|S.H.E|Bajirao Mastani
| Geo Entertainment
|
|-
! scope="row"|Sangat| Ayesha
| Hum TV
|
|-
| rowspan="2"|2016
! scope="row"|Mein Sitara| Surraiya
|TV One Pakistan
|
|-
! scope="row"|Besharam| Mishal
| ARY Digital
|
|-
| rowspan="2"|2017-2018
! scope="row"|Baaghi| Fouzia Azeem
| Urdu 1
|
|-
! scope="row"| Manto| Noor Jehan
|Geo Entertainment
|
|-
| 2019
! scope="row"| Cheekh| Mannat
|rowspan="3"|ARY Digital
|
|-
|2022
!  scope="row"| Fraud| Maya
|
|-
|2023
! scope="row"|Sar-e-Rah|Rania
|
|-
|rowspan="3"|TBA
| style="background:#ffc;" | Tumhare Husn Ke Naam 
| Salma
|rowspan="2"|Green TV
| 
|-
| style="background:#ffc;" |Serial Killer 
|Sarah
|
|-
| style="background:#ffc;" |Gunnah 
|
|Express Entertainment
|
|}

 Special appearance 

Music videos

Web series

Hosting

Other appearances

Awards and nominations

Lux Style Awards
She holds the record of most acting nominations ever received by an actress. 

Other recognitionsTop Bollywood Debutante of 2017 by Eastern EyePride of Pakistan'' by Daily Times Pakistan in 2018

References

External links

 
 
 

Living people
1984 births
Punjabi people
People from Hyderabad, Sindh
Actresses from Karachi
Pakistani film actresses
Pakistani television actresses
Pakistani female models
PTV Award winners
Lollywood
Recipients of the Pride of Performance
Actresses in Urdu cinema
Actresses in Hindi cinema
Pakistani expatriate actresses in India
21st-century Pakistani actresses